Juan Francisco Secada Ramírez (born October 4, 1961), better known as Jon Secada, is a Cuban-born American singer. He has won two Grammy Awards and sold 15 million records, making him one of the best-selling Latin music artists. His music fuses funk, soul music, pop, and Latin percussion.

Secada has written songs for Gloria Estefan, Ricky Martin, and Jennifer Lopez. He has toured with Luciano Pavarotti and recorded duets with Jim Brickman, Olivia Newton-John, and Frank Sinatra.

Secada has performed several times at A Capitol Fourth, an annual Independence Day concert from the United States Capitol televised by PBS.

Early life
Secada was born in 1961 in Havana, Cuba. Secada's father, José, was incarcerated for 3 years as a political prisoner to the communist Cuban government. In 1971, the Secadas received permission to emigrate and moved to Miami. His parents opened a coffee shop. Secada was raised in Hialeah, Florida.

Education
In 1979, Secada graduated from Hialeah Senior High School in Hialeah, Florida. During his performance of A Christmas Carol in 11th grade, he says he realized his musical potential and was encouraged by teachers to pursue music as a career.

After graduating from high school, Secada attended the Frost School of Music at the University of Miami, where he received a Bachelor of Music in 1983 and a Master of Music in jazz vocal performance in 1986. He graduated cum-laude and was later inducted into the Iron Arrow Honor Society, the highest honor bestowed by the University of Miami.

Career
From 1986 to 1991, Secada was a teacher at Miami Dade College. 

In 1986, Secada's University of Miami acquaintances introduced him to Emilio Estefan, a musician in Miami Sound Machine and husband of Gloria Estefan. Estefan listened to one of Secada's demos and then became Secada's mentor and manager. This led to Secada becoming a backup singer for Miami Sound Machine.

In 1991, Secada co-wrote and was a backup singer for "Coming Out of the Dark," a number-one hit song inspired by a tour-bus accident involving Gloria Estefan in 1990, in which her back was broken. In 1992, he released his self-titled debut album, which sold 7 million copies. In 1994, he performed a duet with Frank Sinatra, a re-recording of "The Best Is Yet to Come," released on Sinatra's album Duets II. He also performed at the awards for Miss Venezuela 1994. In 1995,  he performed on Broadway in Grease, and he also presented at the 49th Tony Awards. He recorded If I Never Knew You, a duet with Shanice for Pocahontas. In 1999, he co-wrote and produced "She's All I Ever Had" for Ricky Martin.

In 2003, he performed in Cabaret. He also co-wrote Juramento for Ricky Martin. From 2006 to 2009 Secada was a judge on Latin American Idol for its entire four-season run. In 2007, he co-wrote three songs, and performed in one, on Lilian Garcia's album ¡Quiero Vivir!.

In 2017, he released a tribute album with cover versions of songs by Benny Moré.

Personal life
From 1988 to 1993, Secada was married to Jo Pat Cafro. In May 1995, he started dating Maritere Vilar. They were married in February 1997 and have two children.

Secada resides in a 7,284 square-foot house, with a tennis court and pool, a few blocks west of the University of Miami, his alma mater, in Coral Gables, Florida.

Secada has created the Jon Secada Music Scholarship at the University of Miami, raised funds for The Recording Academy's effort "Keeping Music in Schools," and supports many initiatives including the Pediatric AIDS Unit at Jackson Memorial Hospital, Make-A-Wish Foundation, and the Boys & Girls Clubs of America.

Discography

 Jon Secada (1992)
 Otro Día Más Sin Verte (1992)
 Heart, Soul & a Voice (1994)
 Si Te Vas (1994)
Amor (1995)
Secada (1997)
Better Part of Me (2000)
The Gift (2001)
Amanecer (2002)
Same Dream (2005)
A Christmas Fiesta/Una Fiesta Navideña (2007)
Expressions (2009)
Classics/Clasicos (2010)
Otra Vez (2011)
To Beny Moré With Love (2017)

Awards and nominations
{| class="wikitable sortable plainrowheaders" 
|-
! scope="col" | Award
! scope="col" | Year
! scope="col" | Nominee(s)
! scope="col" | Category
! scope="col" | Result
! scope="col" class="unsortable"| 
|-
!scope="row"|ASCAP Latin Music Awards
| 2000
| "Bella"
| Most Performed Song
| 
| 
|-
!scope="row" rowspan=5|ASCAP Pop Music Awards
| 1992
| "Coming Out of the Dark"
| rowspan=5|Most Performed Songs
| 
| 
|-
| rowspan=3|1994
| "Angel"
| 
| rowspan=3|
|-
| "Do You Believe in Us"
| 
|-
| "Just Another Day"
| 
|-
| 1995
| "I'm Free"
| 
| 
|-
!scope="row" rowspan=2|BMI Latin Awards
| 1993
| "Otro Día Más Sin Verte"
| Song of the Year
| 
| 
|-
| 2001
| "Bella"
| Award-Winning Song
| 
| 
|-
! scope="row" rowspan=8|BMI Pop Awards
| rowspan=4|1994
| "Just Another Day"
| rowspan=8|Award-Winning Songs
| 
| rowspan=4|
|-
| "Do You Believe in Us"
| 
|-
| "Angel"
| 
|-
| "I'm Free"
| 
|-
| rowspan=2|1996
| "Mental Picture"
| 
| rowspan=2|
|-
| "If You Go"
| 
|-
| 1998
| "Too Late Too Soon"
| 
| rowspan=2|
|-
| 2001
| "She's All I Ever Had"
| 
|-
!scope="row"|Billboard Music Awards
| 1993
| Himself
| Top Adult Contemporary Artist
| 
| 
|-
!scope="row"|Billboard Latin Music Awards
| 2001
| "Así"
| Latin Dance Club Play Track
| 
| 
|-
!scope="row" rowspan=3|Grammy Awards
| rowspan=2|1993
| Himself
| Best New Artist
| 
| rowspan=3|
|-
| Otro Día Más Sin Verte
| Best Latin Pop Album
| 
|-
| 1996
| Amor
| Best Latin Pop Performance
| 
|-
!scope="row"|Latin Grammy Awards
| 2017
| To Beny Moré With Love
| Best Traditional Tropical Album
| 
| 
|-
! scope="row" rowspan=7|Lo Nuestro Awards
| rowspan=5|1993
| rowspan=2|Himself
| Male Artist of the Year, Pop
| 
| rowspan=5|
|-
| New Pop Artist of the Year
| 
|-
| Jon Secada
| Pop Album of the Year
| 
|-
| "Angel"
| Pop Song of the Year
| 
|-
| "Otro Día Más Sin Verte"
| Video of the Year
| 
|-
| 1994
| Himself
| Male Artist of the Year, Pop
| 
|-
| 1995
| "Si Te Vas"
| Video of the Year
|

Television Series 

 Alice's Wonderland Bakery as King of Hearts

References

External links

 

1961 births
Living people
Afro-Cuban culture
American entertainers of Cuban descent
American Latin pop singers
Cuban emigrants to the United States
Grammy Award winners
Hialeah Senior High School alumni
Latin Grammy Award winners
Cuban male singer-songwriters
Miami Sound Machine members
Musicians from Miami
People from Havana
People of Afro–Cuban descent
University of Miami Frost School of Music alumni